Opoul XIII were a French Rugby league club based in Opoul-Périllos, Pyrénées Orientales in the Languedoc-Roussillon region. The club played in the  Languedoc-Rousillon League in the French National Division 2. Home games were played at the Stade de la Lime.

History 

Opoul XIII had a rather nondescript and uneventful early years, indeed it would be season 1984/85 while they were in the bottom league Federal Division now called the National Division 2 that they surprisingly reached the league final. There would be no fairy tale ending though as they were beaten 19–8 by Mazan XIII. In season 88/89 they went one better and won the competition after victory over Saint-Hyppolite XIII 27–12. After another decade of no trophies it was announced in 2000 that they were going to merge with close neighbours Salses XIII and become Salses Opoul XIII. Under the new banner the club enjoyed their most successful period. Over the next seven years they reached and won 5 finals, starting with the Federal Division following victory over Le Mas Agenais XIII 36–22. The next two seasons brought consecutive Coupe Falcou victories. The 2005 victory was the first stage of a league and cup double completed when they beat Baroudeurs de Pia XIII 36–20. The final trophy was picked up with a win over Montpellier Red Devils in the Paul Dejean Cup. Following this cup winning season the two clubs went their separate ways again. By 2011 Opoul XIII decided to call it a day and closed

Club honours 

 National Division 1 (National 2) (1): 2004-05
 National Division 2 (Fédéral Division) (2): 1988-89, 2002–03
 Coupe Falcou (2): 2004, 2005
 Paul Dejean Cup (1): 2007

See also

National Division 2

French rugby league teams
2011 disestablishments in France
Defunct rugby league teams in France